Pure is the tenth album by West London Post punk and Indie band The Times released in 1991.<ref name="Discogs.com">[http://www.discogs.com/Times-Pure/release/853600 The Times on Discogs.com]</ref>

Track listing
Side A - Brown Ball (19:45)  From Chelsea Green To Brighton Beach    A Girl Called Mersey    A From L.A. To Edgbaston
Lundi Bleu    
Side B - Pink Ball (20:42)  
A Beautiful Village Called England    
Ours Is A Wonderlove World    
Another Star In Heaven

Personnel
Edward Ball (vocals, guitar, acoustic guitar)
Richard Green (guitar)
Paul Heeren (guitar)

References

The Times (band) albums
1991 albums